Vasco da Cunha Roberto Oliveira (born 28 May 2000), commonly known as Vasco Oliveira, is a Portuguese footballer who plays as a defender for União de Leiria on loan from Farense.

Club career
On 26 January 2022, Oliveira signed with Farense.

Career statistics

Club

Notes

References

External links

2000 births
Footballers from Lisbon
Living people
Portuguese footballers
Association football defenders
U.F.C.I. Tomar players
Cagliari Calcio players
Olbia Calcio 1905 players
S.C. Farense players
U.D. Leiria players
Serie C players
Liga Portugal 2 players
Portuguese expatriate footballers
Portuguese expatriate sportspeople in Italy
Expatriate footballers in Italy